The Harvard Journal of Asiatic Studies (HJAS) is an English-language scholarly journal published by the Harvard-Yenching Institute. HJAS features articles and book reviews of current scholarship in East Asian Studies, focusing on Chinese, Japanese, and Korean history, literature and religion, with occasional coverage of politics and linguistics. It has been called "still Americas's leading sinological journal."

History 
The Harvard Journal of Asiatic Studies was founded in 1936 by the Russian-French scholar Serge Elisséeff under the auspices of the Harvard-Yenching Institute, an independent, non-profit organization founded in 1928 to further the spread of knowledge and scholarship on East and Southeast Asia.  Elisséeff's wide range of knowledge came to be reflected in the diverse character of the journal during the twenty-one years he served as its editor (1936-1957).

Since the days of Elisséeff, the journal has been guided by:
 John Bishop (editor), 1958-1974
 Timothy Connor, 1975
 Donald Shively, 1976-1983
 Ronald Egan, 1983-1987 

 Howard Hibbett, 1988-
 Joanna Handlin Smith, present-

Publishing History 
The journal was published three times yearly from its inception until 1947. From 1948 until 1957 it was released biannually, but from 1958 to 1976 the journal was released only annually or in two-year periods. Since 1977 it has been published twice yearly in June and December.

Contents
The Harvard Journal of Asiatic Studies, with Monumenta Nipponica, is one of the largest and most influential American journals on East Asian scholarship. The journal focuses on analytical articles and does not print translations, unlike Monumenta Nipponica.

Notes

References

External links
  Harvard Journal of Asiatic Studies official website

Cultural journals
Asian studies journals
English-language journals
Publications established in 1936
1936 establishments in Massachusetts
Harvard University academic journals
Chinese studies journals